Mutombo is both a surname and given name in the Tshiluba language.  Notable people with this name include:

Surname
Bibey Mutombo (1961–2008), Congolese footballer and manager
Dikembe Mutombo (born 1966), Congolese-American basketball player
Patrick Mutombo (born 1980), Congolese-Belgian basketball player and coach
Andréa Mbuyi-Mutombo (born 1990), Belgian footballer

Given name
Mutombo Lukusa, Congolese basketball player
Mutombo Bakafwa Nsenda, Congolese debater

Bantu-language surnames